Brad Turvey (born 10 March 1978) is a Filipino actor and video jockey of Channel [V] International.

Early life
Brad Turvey and his twin brother Greg Turvey were born on 10 March 1978 in Hong Kong (then a British territory) to a late Scottish Australian father and a Chinese mother who grew up in Australia. Brad and Greg Turvey grew up in Australia. Both Brad and Greg settled in the Philippines in 2001. Brad was the first to earn an acting role, first in the Penshoppe commercial with U.S. diva Ms. Mandy Moore. He also sang the chorus line of Mandy Moore's song Cry: "In places no one will find". Based on that appearance, he was discovered by Philippine TV station GMA Network as a contract actor.  At GMA, he was a TV host for the Sunday noontime show SOP and one of the original members of Nuts Entertainment with his twin brother. While hosting SOP, he auditioned at Channel V as a video jockey and TV host and was hired. He also became a contract actor for Regal Films, but wasn't offered any movie roles. 

After leaving showbusiness, he went back to Australia with his mother to join Greg. He opened a restaurant "Knox Dining" at Surfers Paradise, Gold Coast, where he married and had a son.

Filmography

Television
Nuts Entertainment (2004–2006)
Encantadia (2005)

Movies
Pinay Pie (2003)

References

External links

1982 births
Living people
VJs (media personalities)
Hong Kong people of Australian descent
Filipino male television actors
Filipino television personalities
21st-century Filipino male actors
GMA Network personalities